Mansonia (Mansonioides) uniformis is a species of zoophilic mosquito belonging to the genus Mansonia.

Distribution
Nearly cosmopolitan distribution. It is found in Angola, Australia, Bangladesh, Benin, Botswana, Burkina Faso, Cambodia, Central African Republic, China, Comoros, Cote d'Ivoire, Ethiopia, Gabon, Gambia, Ghana, Guam, Hong Kong, India, Indonesia, Iran, Japan, Kenya, South Korea, Liberia, Madagascar, Malawi, Malaysia, Mali, Mozambique, Myanmar, Nepal, New Guinea (Island); Papua New Guinea, Niger, Nigeria, Pakistan, Philippines, Senegal, Sierra Leone, Solomon Islands, South Africa, Sri Lanka, Sudan, Taiwan, Tanzania, Thailand, Timor, Uganda, Vietnam, and Zambia.

Description
The female is a medium-sized mosquito with mottled brownish appearance. Proboscis mottled. Scutum with narrow golden scales. Wings also mottled with broad dark and pale scales on all veins. The mosquito mostly attacks humans and birds and bites mostly at night and during shady days. Larva can be found in unshaded open swamps.

Medical importance
Mansonia uniformis can be a vector of human diseases, such as Ross River virus, Kunjin virus, Murray Valley encephalitis, and lymphatic filariasis.

References

External links
The biology of two species of mosquito, Mansonia africana (Theobald) and Mansonia uniformis (Theobald), belonging to the subgenus Mansonioides (Diptera, Culicidae).
A preliminary study on the emergence of Mansonia uniformis (Diptera: Culicidae) from swamps at Richards Bay, Natal, South Africa

uniformis
Insects described in 1901